(born on September 5, 1978 in Katsushika, Tokyo, Japan) is a Japanese volleyball player. She plays a V-Premier League team Takefuji Bamboo.

She entered Ito Yokado Prior in April 1997, after graduating from Kyoei High School.
Kumakura played the World Youth Women's Volleyball Championship in 1995 as a Japanese representative (with Yoshie Takeshita, Hiromi Suzuki, Miyuki Mori, and Makiko Horai). Her team won the championship.

References
 Series of Magazines "Gekkan Volleyball" (published by Nihon Bunka Shuppan in Japan)

Living people
Japanese women's volleyball players
1978 births
Takefuji Bamboo players